Marija "Muska" Babitzin (born 28 June 1952 in Helsinki, Finland) is a Finnish singer. She became famous in 1971 with "Kirjoita postikorttiin" ('Write on the postcard'), a cover version of Send Me a Postcard by Shocking Blue. Her first, eponymous album was released in 1973. It featured the hit "Krokotiili-rock" (cover of Crocodile Rock by Elton John).

Muska participated with her brother Georgij "Ykä" Babitzin in the Finnish national final of Eurovision Song Contest, Euroviisut 1974. The entry "Senhän sanoo järkikin" came sixth. In 1979 she again participated in the Finnish national final with her brother Kirka Babitzin and sister Anna Babitzin. The entry "Aikuiset anteeksi antaa" came fourth.

Muska's elder brothers Sammy (1948–1973) and Kirill alias Kirka (1950–2007) were also well-known Finnish singers. Babitzins are Old Russians of Finland.

Discography

Albums 
 Muska, 1973
 Tää se päivä on (Today Is the Day), 1977
 Pidä kii (Hold On), 1991
 Pienet suuret pojat (Little Big Boys), 1993
 Paha silmä (Evil Eye), 2001
 Anna mulle aikaa (Give Me Some Time), 2006

References

External links 
 Suomen Äänitearkisto (Finnish Record Archives): Marija Babitzin (lists her songs in Finnish)

1952 births
Living people
20th-century Finnish women singers
Finnish people of Russian descent
Finnish people of German-Russian descent
Singers from Helsinki